The Big O is the fifteenth music album recorded by Roy Orbison, and according to the authorised Roy Orbison biography, his second for London Records in the United Kingdom. The music and backing vocals were provided by English group, the Art Movement on all tracks except for "Penny Arcade", which was a studio recording and was released as a single in 1969, peaking at #27 in the UK and would be Orbison's last UK chart success during his lifetime. "Penny Arcade" was also his biggest hit in Australia, spending four weeks at Number One around Christmas, 1969. The second single, "Break My Mind", was Orbison's last Australian chart success during his lifetime, reaching #24 in March 1970. The album was released in Europe in early 1970.

History

In May 1969, Roy Orbison had plans for a live album while he was on tour in the UK. The project was to be called Roy Orbison Live in England. MGM Records were not happy with his plan, however, and Orbison had to compromise. Orbison and the Art Movement turned the Batley Variety Club in West Yorkshire, England into a recording studio. This was done by calling in a mobile studio truck that had all the gear in it and running the cords into the area in which they wanted to record in. Using this technique Orbison was able to achieve the polished studio sound his record label preferred in the most live sounding way possible. The orchestra was overdubbed in Nashville over the stereo two-track mix. While MGM chose not to release the album in North America, London-Decca opted to release it elsewhere in early 1970.

Track listing

All produced by Ron Randall, except for "Penny Arcade" (produced by Wesley Rose)
arranged by Jim Hall

Personnel
 Roy Orbison - guitar, vocals
The Art Movement 
 Billy Dean - guitar
 Roger Bryan - guitar
 Keith Headley - piano 
 Terry Widlake - bass guitar
 Bob Munday - drums
 John Switters - percussion

References

Big O
Big O, The
London Records albums